Kostyantyn Anatoliyovych Bondaryev is a Ukrainian politician and a People's Deputy of Verkhovna Rada.

Biography

Kostyantyn Bondaryev was born on 13 September 1972 in Tashkent, Uzbek SSR. From 1979 to 1981, he studied at Tashkent school No. 110, also attended piano classes, and started going for tennis classes. In 1981 his family moved to Kyiv, where in 1989 Kostyantyn graduated from the school No. 91, also he attended underwater swimming and cycling classes. Kostyantyn Bondaryev is married with two daughters. He's fond of history, literature and painting; also among his hobbies are travelling (active tourism), auto racing, horseback riding, photography. He speaks English.

Education
In 2001 Kostyantyn Bondaryev graduated from Kyiv National University of Engineering and Architecture, the Faculty of Municipal Construction and Economy, with qualification of a civil engineer. During his studies he actively participated in the students' research activities. Along with the academic activities Kostyantyn started working because it was a difficult time (early 1990s) and he had to earn for a living: he was writing tutorials on the  programming languages popular at that time. Then he took his first steps in business.
In 2004 he graduated Kyiv National Economic University, majoring in Business Administration.

Career and political ambitions

In 1995 Kostyantyn Bondaryev founded and registered his first company. He tried to act at different areas related to production, also was engaged in banking business. 
In 1997 - 1999 Kostyantyn Bondaryev worked as financial director of LLC "Maxi-K", and from 1999 until 2000 he acted as the Director of "Maxi-K". At that time "Maxi-K" was one of the largest importers of fuels and lubricants.
In 2000 - 2003 he was working as consulting auditor for "Tetra-audit" company.
In 2002 Kostyantyn Bondaryev has won a seat at Kyiv Oblast' Council, Ivankivsky majority constituency, he was deputy chairman of the budget committee. Along with carrying out his parliamentary duties, Kostyantyn Bondaryev continued being actively engaged in public activities.
In 2004, he joined the ranks of the Socialist Party of Ukraine, as, according to him, this party reflected his ideas about social justice to the fullest extent. In 2005, he led Oblast' SPU headquarters. 
From April 2004 until April 2006, Kostyantyn Bondaryev has been appointed the Chairman of the Supervisory Board of JSC Bank "Veles"
On January 22, 2007, Kostyantyn Bondaryev joined "Fatherland" Union. During the presidential election campaign in 2009-2010 he was working as deputy head of the Kyiv Oblast' headquarters of Yulia Tymoshenko Bloc for advocacy work.
In November 2007, Kostyantyn Bondaryev was elected to the 6th Verkhovna Rada from Yulia Tymoshenko Bloc, No. 114 on the list. 
Activities in Rada:
 Member of the Verkhovna Rada committee on finances, banking, tax and customs policy
 Member of the Standing Delegation in the CIS Interparliamentary Assembly
 Member of the Group for Interparliamentary Relations with the Federal Republic of Brazil
 Member of the Group on Interparliamentary Relations with the Republic of Singapore

In 2012 he was re-elected into parliament on the party list of "Fatherland" (number 45 on this list).

In the 2014 Ukrainian parliamentary election Bondaryev was not re-elected into parliament; because he placed 22nd on the electoral list of Batkivshchina and the party won 17 seats on the electoral list and 2 constituency seats.

Bondaryev returned to parliament  for Batkivshchina in the 2019 Ukrainian parliamentary election as number 14 of its election list (24 members of the party were elected on the national party list, two more in constituencies).

See also 
 List of Ukrainian Parliament Members 2007
 Verkhovna Rada

External links 
  Kostyantyn Bondaryev' profile at Verkhovna Rada of Ukraine official web-site
 Personal website of Kostyantyn Bondaryev

References 

1972 births
Living people
Politicians from Tashkent
Sixth convocation members of the Verkhovna Rada
Seventh convocation members of the Verkhovna Rada
Ninth convocation members of the Verkhovna Rada
All-Ukrainian Union "Fatherland" politicians
Uzbekistani emigrants to Ukraine
Socialist Party of Ukraine politicians